Return to the Promised Land is a gospel music soundtrack and 80th overall album by American country singer Johnny Cash and his wife, June Carter Cash. The album was released in 2000 as the soundtrack to the 45-minute VHS video of the same title released in 1992 by Rev. Billy Graham's World Wide Pictures.

Return to the Promised Land was the last religious-themed album Cash would release in his lifetime; a collection of hymns recorded for American, My Mother's Hymn Book was released posthumously in late 2003 as part of the Unearthed box set and as a 2004 standalone issue.

Background
The Return to the Promised Land video project, filmed entirely in Israel in 1990, was a "20 years later" follow-up to Cash's successful film Gospel Road (which in turn had been inspired by the similarly formatted 1968 album The Holy Land. John Carter Cash is also featured on the recording. The title track song was co-written by Cash, Cash employee Hugh Waddell, and Georgia resident David Ray Skinner, the artist who also designed the Return to the Promised Land logo.

The Return to the Promised Land soundtrack was released by the now-defunct independent label Renaissance Records from Brentwood, Tennessee. Only 2,000 copies of the 2000 CD soundtrack were released as the first-run advance order and media review copies.  The record label shut down just two months after the projected soundtrack release, and no additional copies were ever manufactured. As of 2015 neither the 1992 video nor the soundtrack album, has been reissued. Due to the limited number of manufactured product, both the audio and video copies of Return To The Promised Land are fetching a high price on Amazon.com.

Content
The 2000 CD release includes four Cash-written bonus tracks from an unrelated January 15, 1993 demo session Cash did at LSI Studios in Nashville, to send to the Harry Fox Agency in New York for copyrighting purposes for the House of Cash, and were some of the last recordings Cash made before signing with American Recordings.

The Return To The Promised Land soundtrack ends with an untitled 10-minute bonus track with John's mother, Carrie (aka "Mama Cash") who plays the piano, sings songs, reads her poetry and speaks of her memories of him as a little boy on their farm in rural Arkansas. This recording predated the Return to the Promised Land recording sessions and was a 1989 birthday present to Johnny Cash from Cash's publicist Hugh Waddell (producer of both Return to the Promised Land audio and video releases), so that Cash would always have his mother playing, singing and talking on tape, whenever he went on tour.

A year after making these recordings, Cash would sign with Rick Rubin's American Recordings label, and see a period of career revival (which was under way by the time Return to the Promised Land eventually saw CD release). Two songs from the 1993 same demo session, "Drive On" (not included here) and "Like A Soldier," would later be recorded for Cash's American Recordings album. None of the bonus songs are religious in nature; "Poor Valley Girl" pays tribute to June Carter Cash.

Track listing
All tracks by Johnny Cash except as noted.

External links

Gospel albums by American artists
1993 soundtrack albums
Film soundtracks
Johnny Cash soundtracks